Blue Ridge School is a public combined Elementary, Middle, and High School located in Cashiers, North Carolina and is part of the Jackson County Public Schools System.  It is the smallest school in the district and resulted from the consolidation of the larger Glenville Elementary and High School and the smaller Cashiers Elementary School in 1975.  The building consists of three 100' diameter round "pods," which have no permanent partitions, with one hallway for each radiating into a central pod that houses a lobby and the school's front offices. The school is very similar to Fairview Elementary School in Sylva, but Blue Ridge is smaller than Fairview, no stage and the library isn't in a pod, as well as having grades 7-12 in two detached classroom buildings, making up the "Virtual Early College" component of the school.  The other schools with a high school program in the county are Smoky Mountain High School and Jackson County Early College.  Blue Ridge serves the towns of Cashiers and Glenville as well as the communities of Sapphire, Fairfield, and Whiteside Cove with public education.

External links
 
 https://www.jcpsnc.org/brec
 http://www.publicschoolreview.com/school_ov/school_id/59737
 http://www.greatschools.org/north-carolina/cashiers/1047-Blue-Ridge-School/

Schools in Jackson County, North Carolina
Public high schools in North Carolina
Public middle schools in North Carolina
Public elementary schools in North Carolina